Adam Walsh may refer to:

 Adam Walsh (1974–1981), abducted American child
 Adam Walsh Child Protection and Safety Act, sex-offender legislation signed on the 25th anniversary of the abduction of Adam Walsh (see above)
 Adam Walsh (American football) (1901–1985), American football player and coach